Yaw Danso (born June 15, 1989, in Duayaw Nkwanta) is a Ghanaian footballer.

Career 
Danso came to the United States in 2005 to attend the Principia Upper School and Principia College. In May 2010 was named in the NSCAA All-American Team.

The attacking midfielder signed on 12 March 2012 with Puerto Rico Islanders in the North American Soccer League.

After four years away from the game, Danso signed with the United Soccer League Colorado Springs Switchbacks on 9 September 2016.

Notes

1989 births
Living people
Ghanaian footballers
Ghanaian expatriate footballers
St. Louis Lions players
Puerto Rico Islanders players
Colorado Springs Switchbacks FC players
Expatriate footballers in Puerto Rico
North American Soccer League players
USL Championship players
Soccer players from Missouri
Association football midfielders
Principia College alumni